Kyaw Zaw Oo is an Arakanese politician, who used to serve as a member of parliament in the Rakhine State Hluttaw for (2015–2020) tenure. He was elected MP as an independent candidate in Sittwe-2 constituency in 2015. He is now leading the Arakan Front Party as its vice chair.

Political career
In the 2015 Myanmar general election, as he was elected for the Rakhine State Hluttaw, his father, Wai Sein Aung, was elected as an Amyotha Hluttaw MP from Rakhine State No. 1 parliamentary constituency (i.e. Sittwe township).

Kyaw Zaw Oo proposed, in 2016 December, a motion to the Rakhine state parliament that the local parliament should not recognise the existence or the findings of the (Kofi Annan-led) Advisory Commission on Rakhine State, which was formed by central Myanmar government, the parliament approved it after discussion.

He submitted his resignation from the Arakan National Party on 4 December 2017, a week after Dr Aye Maung's resignation.

On 1982 Myanmar Citizenship Law
Kyaw Zaw Oo has been an advocate of 1982 Myanmar Citizenship Law, in which the citizenship is granted on the principle of jus sanguinis (Latin for “blood rights” or “law of the bloodline”). He wrote articles on this subject in national daily newspapers, and gave talks on it as well.

Alerting about Kha Maung Seik massacre
Near the end of August 2017 in Kha Maung Seik (also known as Fakir Bazar) of Maungdaw Township, about a hundred Hindus men and women were massacred by ARSA. While that incident was buried in the fog caused by the then ARSA violences, Kyaw Zaw Oo investigated it and posted a detailed account about it on Facebook on 13 September 2017, consequently, being the first in alerting the domestic and international communities about the incident.

Open Letter to Min Aung Hlaing
On 17 March 2019, Kyaw Zaw Oo published a bi-lingual open letter to senior general Min Aung Hlaing (commander-in-chief of Myanmar Armed Forces) about many rights violations of Tatmadaw (Myanmar Armed Forces) in Rakhine State, inflicting on lives and property of the civilians, damaging some buildings of cultural heritage as well.

See also
 Arakan Front Party
 Wai Sein Aung

References

Sources

External links
Kyaw Zaw Oo's Blog
Kyaw Zaw Oo (on Facebook)
ကျော်ဇောဦး – ဝီကီပီးဒီးယား

Burmese politicians
1972 births
Living people
Arakanese politicians
People from Rakhine State
Burmese people of Rakhine descent
Arakan Front Party politicians
Government Technical Institute (Pyay) alumni